Dragonships of Vindras is a fantasy-adventure novel series by  American writers Margaret Weis and Tracy Hickman.

Hickman has characterized the story as being "a modern fantasy Odyssey". 

The first book, Bones of the Dragon, was released in hardcover on January 6, 2009. Book Two, titled Secret of the Dragon was released on March 16, 2010. The third book Rage of the Dragon was released on April 24, 2012. The series, originally planned on six books, was published by Tor Books. It concluded with the release of the fourth title, Doom of the Dragon, in 2016.

The authors stated in an afterword in Bones of the Dragon that the series was be dedicated to Weis and Hickman's long-time friend, editor, and mentor, Brian Thomsen. Thomsen died of heart failure as Bones of the Dragon was going to press. Thomsen was fifty-four when he died.

Novels
Bones of the Dragon (2009)
 Secret of the Dragon (2010)
 Rage of the Dragon (2012)
 Doom of the Dragon (2016)

References

External links

 Tracy Hickman's official website
 Tracy & Laura Hickman's DragonHearth podcast site.
  Macmillan's Tor Books site for the series.
 

Fantasy novel series
Novels by Margaret Weis
Novels by Tracy Hickman
Tor Books books